Delyan Slavchev Peevski (born 27 July 1980) is a Bulgarian politician, oligarch, entrepreneur and media mogul. He served as MP from the parliamentary group of the DPS in the 41st, 42nd, 43rd and the 44th National Assembly of Bulgaria and is currently serving as MP in the 47th National Assembly.

In June 2021 the United States Department of the Treasury designated Peevski, the public official Ilko Zhelyazkov and the Bulgarian oligarch Vassil Bojkov, along with 64 entities owned and controlled by Bojkov and Peevski, for their roles in public corruption, pursuant to Executive Order 13818, which builds upon and implements the Global Magnitsky Human Rights Accountability Act. In August 2021 a US law firm representing Peevski has filed a request before the US Treasury Department's Office of Foreign Affairs OFAC to remove the sanctions against their client

Education
Peevski graduated from 119 SOU in Sofia in 1998 and completed his legal studies at the South-West University in 2003. His university diploma is a subject of a dispute for authenticity.

Political career 
In 2001, Peevski joined the National Movement Simeon II (NMSII). In 2007, he was fired as a deputy minister during the Socialist-led government in a corruption scandal. He was investigated, but the investigation was dropped and he was given his job back.

In June 2013, Peevski was elected President of the State Agency for National Security, with the votes of 116 MPs. Thousands of Bulgarians gathered in front of government headquarters in Sofia to protest against the oligarch's appointment, chanting "Mafia" and "resign." Under the pressure of the protests against the Oresharski cabinet that followed, Parliament unanimously revised its decision later the same month. After a couple of months of lack of clarity whether under these conditions Peevski was still considered an MP or not, eventually in December 2013 the Constitutional Court decided that he still was an MP.

In May 2014, Peevski was elected to the European Parliament on the MRF ticket, but immediately thereafter decided to give up his seat. He explained that his motivation to participate in the European elections, while not taking his seat, had been to restore his reputation.

In mid June 2014, three people were arrested due to their involvement in an alleged murder plot against Peevski, but they were eventually released because of a lack of sufficient evidence.

According to an article, published in Der Spiegel "Peevski personifies the oligarchic system of clientelism like no other".

Parliamentary activity
As a member of the Bulgarian National Assembly he moved together with another two MPs from the parliamentary group of the Movement for Rights and Freedoms - Yordan Tsonev and Hamid Hamid, amendments to the Bank Insolvency Act. The amendments, which are related to Corpbank (KTB), were conclusively adopted in February, 2018, Bulgarian News Agency reported. According to the movers' reasons, the idea of the amendments is to establish an effective mechanism for replenishing a bankrupt bank's bankruptcy estate and to suppress schemes for plundering assets purchased directly or indirectly on money originating from such a bank.

The president of Bulgaria, Rumen Radev has put a veto on the amendments. His veto was later overturned by the MPs and the amendments were conclusively adopted by the Parliament on 7 March 2018.

Those were second amendments, filed by Peevski and his colleagues from the Parliamentary group of MRF, with reference to the so-called "KTB case" and unveiling the truth about the embezzlement of the bank by its majority shareholder Tzvetan Vassilev. In 2016 the MP together with two more members of the same parliamentary group - Yordan Tzonev and the former minister of finances Peter Chobanov, moved urgent amendment to the Bank Insolvency Act in order to allow the publicizing of the report of AlixPartners Services UK LLP, which was contracted to trace and take action for the preservation and recovery of the assets of the failed Corporate Commercial Bank (KTB), Bulgarian News Agency reported. After the amendments were adopted, the report was translated in Bulgarian and published in May, 2016. According to the document, the audit confirmed that the bank functioned as a financial pyramid and was siphoned off through large loans to companies related to the majority shareholder Tzvetan Vassilev. More than half of the loans at the value of 2,5 billion BGN were given to companies related to Vassilev. The report also shows that the majority shareholder also used the bank for "personal transactions".

On July 4, Parliament approved in principle other amendments, moved by Peevski and his colleagues Yordan Tzonev, Hamid Hamid and Velislava Krusteva, Bulgarian News Agency reported. The new bill is on the disclosure of real owners and financing of media organizations. Authors stated that the amendments aim to bring full transparency on the media sector now having problems with online media outlets, whose owners and financing are unknown. And to show whether or not this is a monopolist market. Yet, the opponents of the amendments stated that the bill attacks Delyan Peevski's rivals because it requires disclosure of all sources of financing of media organizations other than the proceeds from advertising and bank loans. The opponents of the bill state that "it is aimed against the opposition-minded news media, which use financing from non-government organizations and foreign grants". The day after bill's approval, Peevski, Hamid, Tzonev and Krusteva moved additional amendments requiring disclosure of bank loans and advertising incomes as well in order to meet the expectations of society. Yet the bill is still under attacks by its opponents.

Peevski has the lowest attendance in the 44th parliament. He has appeared in only one plenary session, according to data from December 2017.

Media and business empire 

As of 2013, Peevski's media empire controlled six of the 12 largest circulating newspapers. It also had a monopoly on newspaper distribution and digital TV channels. By 2016, according to Radio Bulgaria, the number of newspapers he owned increased to more than 20. According to Reporters Without Borders, his media group consisting of 6 newspapers, "New Bulgarian Media Group" controls nearly 80% of print media distribution. Peevskiis said to control or influence many other local media and websites, that he does not officially own.

In 2016, Peevski also owned several construction companies and was the owner of Bulgartabac, the biggest manufacturer and seller of tobacco and related products. “The Turkish Financial Crime Investigation Board (MASAK) and the Turkish Ministry of Customs and Trade on their part accused Bulgartabac of being one of the biggest cigarette-smuggling entities in Turkey and of being closely allied to the banned Kurdistan Workers’ Party, the PKK, which is on the European list of terrorist organizations,” according to Radio Bulgaria.

In early 2016, Peevski published a letter to the media where he said he would no longer start any new business projects in Bulgaria. He said his decision was due to an "ongoing 'smear' campaign" and political pressure.

In an analysis, Radio Bulgaria said it was difficult to pinpoint why Peevski was downsizing his business empire. However, they wrote:"Still, some analysts say there is a connection between the shocks tearing across the Peevski conglomerate and the bankruptcy, two years ago, of the Corporate Commercial Bank with majority owner, Peevski's own former business partner and friend Tsvetan Vasilev. There is ample evidence that it was precisely the crediting from that bank that helped Delyan Peevski build his media empire, stone by stone, an empire that has been putting out tentacles into many other economic sectors and spheres. But the cheap (free?) financing is now gone and the media market is not particularly lucrative."

On January 27, 2021, Delyan Peevski sold the media he owned to the leading provider of telecommunications services and media in Southeastern Europe United Group.

Controversy
Peevski has been accused of using his newspapers for influence peddling and to launch attack campaigns against journalists and other opponents. Peevski was accused of corruption in a Reporters Without Borders 2018 report.

Sanctions
The U.S. Department of the Treasury has imposed sanctions on Peevski since 2 June 2021, pursuant to Executive Order 13818, which builds upon and implements the Global Magnitsky Human Rights Accountability Act and targets perpetrators of serious human rights abuse and corruption. Sanctions imposed through EO 13818 include a freezing of assets under the US and a ban on transactions with any US person.

The U.S. Department of the Treasury wrote:"Delyan Slavchev Peevski (Peevski) is an oligarch who previously served as a Bulgarian MP and media mogul and has regularly engaged in corruption, using influence peddling and bribes to protect himself from public scrutiny and exert control over key institutions and sectors in Bulgarian society. "
In August 2021 it was reported that Delyan Peevski has filed a request before the US Treasury Department's Office of Foreign Assets Control (OFAC) to remove the sanctions. He is represented by the US law firm Morgan Lewis & Bockius LLP.

In February 2023, the Foreign, Commonwealth and Development Office of the United Kingdom issued sanctions to several high profile Bulgarian figures, amongst which Peevski.

References

Bibliography 

Members of the National Assembly (Bulgaria)
Businesspeople from Sofia
21st-century Bulgarian lawyers
1980 births
Living people
Politicians from Sofia
People sanctioned under the Magnitsky Act